These are the official results of the Women's Heptathlon competition at the 1987 World Championships in Rome, Italy. There were a total number of 25 participating athletes, including six non-finishers. The competition started on August 31, 1987, and ended on September 1, 1987.

Medalists

Schedule
August 31, 1987

September 1, 1987

Records

Results

See also
 1983 Women's World Championships Heptathlon (Helsinki)
 1984 Women's Olympic Heptathlon (Los Angeles)
 1986 Women's European Championships Heptathlon (Stuttgart)
 1987 Hypo-Meeting
 1988 Women's Olympic Heptathlon (Seoul)
 1990 Women's European Championships Heptathlon (Split)
 1991 Women's World Championships Heptathlon (Tokyo)
 1992 Women's Olympic Heptathlon (Barcelona)

References
 Results
 IAAF Statistics Handbook Daegu 2011, Part 3 of 5, Page 263

H
Heptathlon at the World Athletics Championships
1987 in women's athletics